Satel Film is an Austrian TV and film production and distribution company, founded in 1971 and based in Vienna. Its documentaries, TV series and shorts include Kottan ermittelt, Schlosshotel Orth, the biopics Andreas Hofer – Die Freiheit des Adlers and (as a co-production) Brecht, thriller Opernball, the TV films Heilerin I and Heilerin II and the police procedural SOKO Donau, released in Germany as SOKO Wien.

References

1971 establishments in Austria
Film production companies of Austria